Julia Greenwood (born 1 February 1951) is an English former cricketer who played as a right-arm pace bowler. She appeared in 6 Test matches and 3 One Day Internationals for England between 1976 and 1979. She also played 5 matches for Young England at the 1973 World Cup. She played domestic cricket for Yorkshire.

In test cricket, she took 29 wickets at an average of 16.13, with best innings bowling figures of 6/46 and best match figures of 11/63, against the West Indies in 1979 at the St Lawrence Ground, Canterbury. These are the best match bowling figures in English women's test history. She took 13 wickets in her 8 one day internationals at an average of 17.07 with a best of 3/21.

References

External links
 

1951 births
Living people
Cricketers from Dewsbury
England women Test cricketers
England women One Day International cricketers
Young England women cricketers
Yorkshire women cricketers